The Immaculate Conception Cathedral  also called The Cathedral of La Vega, it is a religious building of the Catholic Church located in the city of La Vega, Dominican Republic. It is the cathedral of the Diocese of La Vega and one of the most important shrines of the Dominican Republic.

The design of the cathedral, located opposite the central park of this city, corresponded to the Dominican architect Pedro Mena Lajara and was inaugurated on February 22, 1992, by the then president of that country Joaquin Balaguer, who handed the keys to the Bishop Monsignor Juan Antonio Flores. Since its inception, this religious monument became a place of choice for both parishioners and devotees of the Virgin Mary, as domestic and foreign tourists.

See also
Roman Catholicism in the Dominican Republic

References

Roman Catholic cathedrals in the Dominican Republic
La Vega, Dominican Republic
Roman Catholic churches completed in 1992
20th-century Roman Catholic church buildings